A pony wall is a short wall.

In different circumstances, it may refer to:

a half wall that only extends partway from floor to ceiling, without supporting anything.
a stem wall, a concrete wall that extends from the foundation slab to the cripple wall or floor joists.
a cripple wall, a framed wall that extends from the stem wall or foundation slab to the floor joists.
a knee wall, which extends from the floor to a countertop, rafter, or handrail.

Types of wall
Building engineering